Red, usually in all caps as RED, is a screen editor for the VAX/VMS operating system using VT100 terminals. It was designed to be efficient in an interactive  environment. RED's  syntax  is similar to  TECO's. It supports cut/paste and user-written macros.
RED is written in the STOIC programming language.

References

External links
RED text editor source and VMS executables

Free text editors
OpenVMS text editors